Soral is a surname. People with the surname include:

 Alain Soral (born 1958), Swiss essayist
 Agnès Soral (born 1960), Swiss actress and writer
 Bensu Soral (born 1991), Turkish actress
 Hande Soral (born 1987), Turkish-Cypriot actress
 Pavol Šoral (1903–1977), Slovak football player

Turkish-language surnames